The Mississippi Pride were a professional American football team that played during the 1999 season as part of the Regional Football League. They played their home games at Mississippi Veterans Memorial Stadium in Jackson, Mississippi.

The team was announced as one of the league's charter members on November 12, 1998. For their lone season, former Mississippi State Bulldogs assistant coach Johnny Plummer served as head coach.

Although the team was scheduled to play a 12-game regular season, poor attendance and sagging revenues would prove too much for the new league. In the shortened regular season, the Pride had a 4–4 record. In the postseason, the Pride were seeded third in the four-team playoff bracket, and lost to the second seed, the Houston Outlaws. Pride starter Stewart Patridge was named the all-RFL quarterback. After the season, the team and league ceased operation.

1999 season schedule

 The June 5 game was originally scheduled for June 6 in Toledo against the Ohio Thunder.

References

Further reading

External links
Remember the RFL
Mississippi Pride Football TV Commercial “New Set of Rules”
Mississippi Pride Lives On via Wayback Machine

Pride
Regional Football League teams
American football teams established in 1998
American football teams disestablished in 1999
1998 establishments in Mississippi
1999 disestablishments in Mississippi
Sports in Jackson, Mississippi